Sladenia shaefersi is a species of fish in the family Lophiidae. It also commonly goes by the name of Shaefer's anglerfish. It was first discovered in the Caribbean Sea off the coast of Colombia and was described in 1976. It grows to  standard length.

Etymology
The fish is named in honor of Edward A. Schaefers, the former chief of the Exploratory Fishing and Gear Research Branch of the now renamed Bureau of Commercial Fisheries.

References

Lophiidae
Fish of the Atlantic Ocean
Fish of the Caribbean
Taxa named by John H. Caruso
Taxa named by Harvey R. Bullis
Fish described in 1976